Hiroki Suzuki may refer to:

, Japanese actor
, Japanese actor and singer